Rockville Township is one of seventeen townships in Kankakee County, Illinois, USA.  As of the 2010 census, its population was 879 and it contained 326 housing units.  It was formerly a township of Will County until Kankakee County was created.  The township's name may have been derived from a Potawatomi village known to the pioneers as Rock Village.

Geography

Unincorporated towns
 Deselm at 
 Flickerville at 
(This list is based on USGS data and may include former settlements.)

Adjacent townships
 Wilton Township, Will County (north)
 Peotone Township, Will County (northeast)
 Manteno Township (east)
 Bourbonnais Township (southeast)
 Limestone Township (south)
 Salina Township (southwest)
 Custer Township, Will County (west)
 Wesley Township, Will County (west)

Cemeteries
The township contains these two cemeteries: Blooms Grove and DeSelm.

Airports and landing strips
 Moran Landing Strip
 Neiner Airport

Landmarks
 Kankakee River State Park (north edge)
 Kankakee River State Park (north quarter)
 Kankakee River State Park (vast majority)

Demographics

Government
The township is governed by an elected Town Board of a Supervisor and four Trustees.  The Township also has an elected Assessor, Clerk, Highway Commissioner and Supervisor.  The Township Garage is located on Manteno-Deselm Road, Manteno Illinois 60950

Political districts
 Illinois's 11th congressional district
 State House District 79
 State Senate District 40

Schools 
Rockville Township used to have 2 schools.  Taylor Schoolhouse was a one-room school located near Deselm which opened in 1905 and closed in 1954. Deselm School was located in Deselm and that school also closed in 1954 when the schools were consolidated into the Manteno school district.

School districts
 Manteno Community Unit School District 5
 Peotone Community Unit School District 207-U

References
 
 United States Census Bureau 2007 TIGER/Line Shapefiles
 United States National Atlas

External links
 Kankankee County Official Site
 City-Data.com
 Illinois State Archives

Townships in Kankakee County, Illinois
Populated places established in 1853
Townships in Illinois